The sixth season of Designing Women premiered on CBS on September 16, 1991, and concluded on May 4, 1992. The season consisted of 23 episodes. Created by Linda Bloodworth-Thomason, the series was produced by Bloodworth/Thomason Mozark Productions in association with Columbia Pictures Television.

Cast

Main cast
 Dixie Carter as Julia Sugarbaker
 Annie Potts as Mary Jo Shively
 Julia Duffy as Allison Sugarbaker
 Jan Hooks as Carlene Frazier-Dobber
 Meshach Taylor as Anthony Bouvier

Recurring cast
 Michael Goldfinger as Rusty
 Ray McKinnon as Dwayne Dobber
 Alice Ghostley as Bernice Clifton
 Brian Lando as Quinton Shively
 George Newbern as Payne McIlroy

Guest cast

 Jean Smart as Charlene Frazier-Stillfield
 Charles Frank as Mark Boswell
 Jerry Lacy as Barry Binsford
 Marla Maples as Herself
 M. C. Gainey as T. Tommy Reed
 Blake Clark as Skip Jackson
 Ian Patrick Williams as Charles Tremain
 Kristina Wayborn as Gail
 Charles Levin as Simba 

 Doug Ballard as Davis Gillette 
 Tino Insana as Shamu
 William Morgan Sheppard as Professor Burton
 Jackie Joseph as Darla Jackson
 Gretchen Wyler as Ivy McBride
 Lisa Jane Persky as Heather
 Charles Nelson Reilly as Himself
 Gary Morris as Dr. Dan Hacker
 Jackée Harry as Vanessa Chamberlain

Episodes

DVD release
The sixth season was released on DVD by Shout! Factory on April 3, 2012.

References

External links
 

Designing Women seasons
1991 American television seasons
1992 American television seasons